Dotanang is a village in central-western Bhutan. It lies at an altitude of 2594 metres (8510 ft).

Nearby settlements include Atsho Chhubar (13.8 miles), Barshong (8.3 miles), Kencho (10.9 miles), Yuwak (13 miles), Punakha (12.6 miles) Thimphu (6.3 miles), Tashi Chho Dzong (6.1 miles), Tshalunang (9 miles).

See also 
List of cities, towns and villages in Bhutan

Populated places in Bhutan